Peter Koefoed (22 April 1902 – 14 December 1983) was a Danish field hockey player who competed in the 1928 Summer Olympics. He was born in Soerabaja, Dutch East Indies and died in Grenaa.

In 1928 he was a member of the Danish team which was eliminated in the first round of the Olympic tournament after two wins and two losses.  He played all four matches as back.

References

External links
 
 profile

1902 births
1983 deaths
Danish male field hockey players
Olympic field hockey players of Denmark
Field hockey players at the 1928 Summer Olympics
People from Norddjurs Municipality
Sportspeople from the Central Denmark Region
Danish expatriates in the Dutch East Indies